Rhizopogon is a genus of ectomycorrhizal basidiomycetes in the family Rhizopogonaceae. Species form hypogeous sporocarps commonly referred to as "false truffles". The general morphological characters of Rhizopogon sporocarps are a simplex or duplex peridium surrounding a loculate gleba that lacks a columnella. Basidiospores are produced upon basidia that are borne within the fungal hymenium that coats the interior surface of gleba locules. The peridium is often adorned with thick mycelial cords, also known as rhizomorphs, that attach the sporocarp to the surrounding substrate. The scientific name Rhizopogon is Greek for 'root' (Rhiz-) 'beard' (-pogon) and this name was given in reference to the rhizomorphs found on sporocarps of many species.

Rhizopogon species are primarily found in ectomycorrhizal association with trees in the family Pinaceae and are especially common symbionts of pine, fir, and Douglas fir trees.  Through their ectomycorrhizal relationships Rhizopogon are thought to play an important role in the ecology of coniferous forests. Recent micromorphological and molecular phylogenetic study has established that Rhizopogon is a member of the Boletales, closely related to Suillus.

Taxonomy and diversity

Historical classification
The genus Rhizopogon occurs throughout the natural and introduced ranges of family Pinaceae trees. Though this range covers much of the northern temperate zones, the diversity of Rhizopogon species is well characterized only in North America and Europe. There are currently over 150 recognized species of Rhizopogon. The morphology of Rhizopogon species is highly cryptic and characters vary greatly throughout sporocarp maturity. This has led to the description of multiple species from various developmental stages of a single fungus.

The genus Rhizopogon was first described from Europe by Elias Magnus Fries in 1817. The North American monograph was produced by Alexander H. Smith in 1966 with second author credits given  posthumously to Sanford Myron Zeller due to his contributions to the study of the genus. A European monograph of Rhizopogon has also been published. In the recent past, molecular phylogenetic methods have allowed the revision of the taxonomic concepts of the genus Rhizopogon

Modern classification

Modern taxonomic concepts of the genus Rhizopogon recognize five subgenera of Rhizopogon.  These are subgenus Rhizopogon, subgenus Versicolores, subgenus Villosuli, subgenus Amylopogon, and subgenus Roseoli.

Ecology

Mammalian diet and spore dispersal
Rhizopogon species have been established as a common component in the diet of many small mammals  as well as deer in Western North America.  The viability of Rhizopogon spores is maintained  and may even be increased after mammalian gut passage, making mammals an important dispersal vector  for Rhizopogon.

Disturbance ecology
Rhizopogon species are common members of the fungal communities that colonize the roots of trees during seedling establishment and persist into old growth stands. Rhizopogon spores are long lived in soil and the spores of some species can persist for at least four years with an increase in viability over time.  Rhizopogon seems to be especially common upon the roots of establishing tree seedlings following disturbance such as fire or logging. Rhizopogon are also abundant colonizers of pot cultivated and field cultivated  conifer seedlings growing in soil from conifer stands that lacked observations of Rhizopogon upon the roots of mature trees. These finding suggest that Rhizopogon species are an important factor in the recovery of conifer forests following disturbance.

Invasive facilitator 
Rhizopogon species have been shown to have a global distribution in the Homogenocene. The enzymes exuded from some species within the subgenus amylopogon is essential in activating seed germination in some species of Monotropoideae, such as Pterspora andromedeae. This makes Rhizopogon an obligatory host to species like P. andromedeae. The exoenzymatic activity also confers higher competitive advantages to host species, mainly within the genus Pinus, by helping to break down nutrients within the soil. The presence of Rhizopogon in soil facilitates Pinus as an invasive species. This exoenzymatic activity is nitrogen limited. In the case of R. amylopogon parasitized by P. andromedeae the nitrogen cost of exoenzymatic production is in part paid for by bacteria within the family Burkholderiaceae that is hosted by P. andromedeae

Species 

Rhizopogon albidus
Rhizopogon ater
Rhizopogon amylopogon
Rhizopogon atroviolaceus
Rhizopogon brunneniger
Rhizopogon ellenae
Rhizopogon evadens
Rhizopogon fulvigleba
Rhizopogon fuscorubens
Rhizopogon hawkerae
Rhizopogon luteolus
Rhizopogon nigrescens
Rhizopogon occidentalis
Rhizopogon ochraceorubens
Rhizopogon parksii
Rhizopogon parvisporus 
Rhizopogon pedicellus
Rhizopogon roseolus
Rhizopogon salebrosus
Rhizopogon subareolatus
Rhizopogon subaustralis
Rhizopogon subcaerulescens
Rhizopogon subpurpurascens
Rhizopogon subsalmonius
Rhizopogon succosus
Rhizopogon togasawariana
Rhizopogon truncatus
Rhizopogon vesiculosus
Rhizopogon villosulus
Rhizopogon vinicolor
Rhizopogon vulgaris

Ethnomycology

Forestry
The first intentional use of Rhizopogon species in forestry occurred in the early part of the 20th century when Rhizopogon luteolus was deliberately introduced into Pinus radiata plantations in Western Australia after it was observed to improve tree growth. Since that time, Rhizopogon species have been widely studied as a component of managed forests. Rhizopogon species have been noted as common members of the ectomycorrhizal community colonizing tree roots of pine and Douglas-fir timber plantations. Naturally occurring Rhizopogon roseolus (=rubescens) spores have been shown to out-compete the spores of other ectomycorrhizal fungi in pine plantations even when competing spores were directly inoculated onto seedlings. The survival rate and performance of pine and Douglas-fir plantation seedlings are increased after inoculation with Rhizopogon species.

Gastronomy

Though this genera is considered edible, most members are not held in high culinary esteem. A notable exception is Rhizopogon roseolus (=rubescens) which is considered a delicacy in Japan where it is traditionally known as shōro. Techniques for the commercial cultivation of this fungus in pine plantations have been developed and applied with successful results in Japan and New Zealand.

References

External links

Index Fungorum
A preliminary account of the North American species of Rhizopogon by Alexander H. Smith and S. M. Zeller, 1966. (Full text of monograph.)

Rhizopogonaceae
Boletales genera